Atma Singh Gill (born 12 October 1938) is a member of the 14th Lok Sabha of India. He represents the Sirsa constituency of Haryana and is a member of the Indian National Congress (INC) political party. His son in law Mr. Maghar Singh Bhullar is a former Zila Parishad member from the INLD living in Vill Nezadela Sirsa.

External links
 Official biographical sketch in Parliament of India website
Atma Singh found in guest house with two call girls 

1938 births
Living people
People from Sirsa district
Indian National Congress politicians
India MPs 2004–2009
People from Sirsa, Haryana
People from Fatehabad, Haryana
Lok Sabha members from Haryana
Punjabi people